This is the discography of singer Chris Connor. Connor recorded approximately 42 albums and several singles between the years 1949 to 2003. This discography lists all known first-release EPs, LPs and CDs released by the singer, and includes some live recordings released on CD containing her 1950s radio performances.

Early studio recordings (1949–1953) 
Chris Connor moved to New York in 1949 and secured a job as a big band singer, working with Claude Thornhill and his vocal group The Snowflakes. Connor toured with Thornhill off and on until 1952, when she joined the Jerry Wald Orchestra. After a brief period with Wald, she landed her dream job as a replacement for June Christy in Stan Kenton's orchestra. Including an alternate recording of All About Ronnie, Chris Connor only recorded 8 songs in the Capitol Records studio with Kenton's band. After non-stop touring in the United States and performing live on radio, she left the Kenton band in late 1953 to establish herself as a solo performer.

Early live recordings (selected) (1952–1953)

Studio albums (1954–1966)

Bethlehem Records 
Chris Connor recorded around 38 sides for the Bethlehem Records label between December 1953 and April 1955. Connor was the first vocalist signed to the new label, and her dual 10" LPs Sings Lullabys of Birdland and Sings Lullabys For Lovers were the first albums ever released by Bethlehem. Only one full length 12" LP was released during Chris' tenure there: the album This Is Chris (in 1955).  Her other two Bethlehem albums were issued in 1957 (after she left the label).

Bethlehem EPs & Singles

Atlantic Albums 
Chris Connor's longest (and most successful) association with a record label was at Atlantic Records. She began recording for Atlantic in 1956 and, over the course of seven years, released thirteen critically acclaimed and best-selling albums. Fans often consider this period the peak of Connor's career, as she had complete artistic control over both the songs and the musicians with whom she would work.

During the Atlantic period, Connor worked with many well-respected musicians in the industry, including Doc Severinsen, Jerry Wexler, Quincy Jones, Hank Jones, Rufus Jones, Nesuhi Ertegun, Osie Johnson, and Ronnie Ball. She also recorded many relatively unknown compositions during this time, including those of Jerry Leiber and Mike Stoller, Frank Loesser, Margo Guryan, Sy Coleman, Johnny Mercer, Harold Arlen, Bronislau Kaper, Peggy Lee, Ornette Coleman, Benny Goodman, Alex North, Ogden Nash and Bart Howard.

In April, 1960, Billboard Magazine announced   that Connor would be awarded a gold record for the sale of 500,000 albums for the label.

Atlantic EPs & Singles

Roulette Records 
Both Chris Connor and trumpeter Maynard Ferguson previously performed with the Stan Kenton band. In 1960, Atlantic Records made a special arrangement with Roulette Records, allowing Connor to record an album with Ferguson for their label (Ferguson was under contract with Roulette at the time). As part of the deal, he also recorded Double Exposure on Atlantic Records with Connor.

FM Records 
Between 1962 and 1963, Chris Connor's manager, Monte Kay convinced her to leave Atlantic Records to join his new record company, FM Records. This turned out to be a poor choice for Connor, since she no longer had the support of a big label to promote her music. Her first release with the label, Chris Connor at the Village Gate, failed to mirror the sales success of her previous Atlantic efforts (although it was critically acclaimed). Before her second release on FM, A Weekend in Paris, was even released, the FM label declared bankruptcy in 1964.

FM Single

ABC Records/Paramount Records 
By the end of 1964, Connor became a free agent and secured a 2-album deal with ABC Records. While at ABC, she released an album of Bossa Nova themed songs.  She also began exploring the pop market, adding to her repertoire songs from The Beatles, Steve Lawrence and songs from recent films, such as Hush Hush Sweet Charlotte, Baby the Rain Must Fall and the play Who's Afraid of Virginia Woolf?.

ABC-Paramount EPS & Singles

Studio albums (1969–2003) 
After her ABC contract expired, Chris Connor began releasing albums for various record labels, many of which were geared for the Japanese market. She was without a regular record contract until the mid-80s, when she released two albums on the Contemporary Records label in 1987. Between 1991-1995, she released 4 albums for the Japanese label Alfa Records. Six years later, she went back into the recording studio to record tracks for the U.S. HighNote Records label between 2001–2002. Her last solo album was issued in 2003.

Additional compilations and live recordings

External links 
 Chris Connor Big Band Recordings (1949-1953)
 Chris Connor Bethlehem Discography (1953-1959)
 Chris Connor Atlantic Records Discography (1956-1963)
 All Music Guide - Chris Connor
 The Penguin Jazz Guide: The History of the Music in the 1000 Best Albums, 2010
 Obituary of Chris Connor
 Jazz Wax - 2008 Interview with Chris Connor
 Encyclopædia Britannica - Chris Connor

 
Discographies of American artists